Concepció Cañadell i Salvia (born 1978) is a Catalan politician and a member of the Congress of Deputies of Spain.

Early life
Cañadell was born in 1978. She has diplomas in labour relations and business from the University of Lleida.

Career
Cañadell contested the 2007 local elections as a Convergence and Union (CiU) electoral alliance candidate in Térmens and was elected. She was re-elected at the 2011 local elections. She was re-elected at the 2015 local elections and became mayor of Térmens. She was re-elected at the 2019 local elections. Cañadell was president of Noguera County Council from 2015 to 2019.

At the April 2019 general election Cañadell was placed second on the Together for Catalonia (JuntsxCat) electoral alliance's list of candidates in the Province of Lleida but the alliance only managed to win one seat in the province and as a result she failed to get elected. She contested the November 2019 general election as a JuntsxCat electoral alliance candidate in the Province of Lleida and was elected to the Congress of Deputies.

Personal life
Cañadell is married.

Electoral history

References

External links

1978 births
Catalan European Democratic Party politicians
Women politicians from Catalonia
Convergence and Union politicians
Democratic Convergence of Catalonia politicians
Living people
Mayors of places in Catalonia
Members of the 14th Congress of Deputies (Spain)
Municipal councillors in the province of Lleida
Together for Catalonia (2017) politicians
University of Lleida alumni
Women members of the Congress of Deputies (Spain)